Sir Harold George Raggatt  (25 January 19002 November 1968) was a senior Australian public servant and geologist, best known for his time as Secretary of the Department of National Development.

Life and career
Harold Raggatt was born on 25 January 1900 in North Sydney, New South Wales.

Raggatt joined the Australian Public Service in 1939.

Between 1951 and 1965, Raggatt was Secretary of the Department of National Development. In the role, he worked to measure Australia's natural resources, and to develop a policy to assist in Australia's economic development. In 1960, he helped broker the lifting of the 20-year embargo on Australian export of iron ore.

Awards
Raggat was made a Commander of the Order of the British Empire in June 1954. In June 1963, Raggatt was appointed a Knight Bachelor.

References

1900 births
1968 deaths
Australian public servants
Australian Commanders of the Order of the British Empire
Australian Knights Bachelor
Fellows of the Australian Academy of Science
Australian geologists